Patrick Ishyaka (born 28 July 1972) is a Rwandan long-distance runner. He competed in the men's marathon at the 1996 Summer Olympics.

References

External links
 

1972 births
Living people
Athletes (track and field) at the 1996 Summer Olympics
Rwandan male long-distance runners
Rwandan male marathon runners
Olympic athletes of Rwanda
Place of birth missing (living people)
Olympic male marathon runners